William Thomas Cahill (June 25, 1912July 1, 1996) was an American politician, lawyer, and academic who served as the 46th governor of New Jersey from 1970 to 1974. A Republican, Cahill previously served in the New Jersey General Assembly and U.S. House of Representatives before being elected governor in the 1969 New Jersey gubernatorial election.

Early life
Cahill was born in Philadelphia to Irish immigrants William P. Cahill and Rose Cahill. The family moved to South Jersey in 1919. He attended Camden Catholic High School in Camden, New Jersey, and graduated in 1929. Afterwards, Cahill graduated St. Joseph's College (now Saint Joseph's University) at Philadelphia in 1933. He returned to Camden to study at the Rutgers School of Law - Camden, receiving his law degree in 1937.

Political career 

In 1937 and 1938, Cahill was a special agent of the Federal Bureau of Investigation. In 1939 he was admitted to the bar and began his political career. Living in Collingswood, New Jersey, Cahill was the city prosecutor of Camden, New Jersey in 1944 and 1945, was the first assistant prosecutor of Camden County from 1948 to 1951 and was a special deputy attorney general of the State of New Jersey in 1951. 

Cahill was a member of the New Jersey General Assembly from 1951 to 1953. Cahill was elected to the Eighty-sixth and to the five succeeding Congresses. During his tenure in the US House, Cahill voted for the Civil Rights Act of 1964 and the Voting Rights Act of 1965.  He served in the until resigning to assume his seat as governor, serving from January 3, 1959 to January 19, 1970.   Throughout his tenure in Congress and as governor, Cahill was widely viewed as a moderate Republican.

Governor of New Jersey

In 1969, Cahill ran for Governor of New Jersey, facing off against Democrat Robert B. Meyner, who had previously held the office from 1954 to 1962.  Cahill defeated Meyner and became New Jersey's first Republican governor in 16 years.

Cahill served as governor from January 20, 1970 to January 15, 1974, and assumed office with a Republican-controlled legislature to support him. Among his accomplishments as governor were new automobile emission standards, an increase in the sales tax from 3 to 5 percent, the introduction of the state lottery, and the passage of no-fault auto insurance.  He also played a role in bringing the New York Giants from Yankee Stadium to a new field in the Hackensack Meadowlands.

On Thanksgiving Day 1971, two months after the Attica State prison riots in upstate New York, a similar rebellion rose at Rahway State Prison.  The revolt was quieted without violence, and Cahill's role in ending the conflict was widely commended.  Cahill also appointed a commission that recommended the creation of a state income tax, which proved to be controversial with voters. The proposal was defeated in July 1972, but a state income tax was finally instituted four years later, after Cahill left office.

In spite of his many successes and accomplishments as governor, Cahill's term was derailed by scandal.  In 1972, Secretary of State Paul J. Sherwin was convicted for fixing a $600,000 state highway contract with a contractor who returned the favor with $10,000 to Cahill's associates.  Then, in April 1973, former New Jersey Republican State Committee chairman Nelson G. Gross and State Treasurer Joseph McCrane, who had been finance chairman for Cahill's 1969 campaign, were both charged with illegally making campaign donations to the governor as tax deductions.  Both men were convicted the following year.  Although investigators were unable to implicate Cahill in either affair, his reputation suffered as a result of these setbacks.

Cahill ran for re-election in 1973.  Damaged by the scandals in his administration, he was defeated in the Republican primary election by the more conservative Congressman Charles Sandman, who went on to lose the general election to Democrat Brendan Byrne.  During his final months as governor, Cahill named his predecessor, Democrat Richard J. Hughes, as chief justice of the New Jersey Supreme Court.

Death
After his term as governor, Cahill was a senior fellow at the Woodrow Wilson School of Public and International Affairs at Princeton University from 1974 to 1978. Cahill died at his daughter's house in Haddonfield, New Jersey on July 1, 1996 of peripheral artery disease. A funeral service was held at Christ the King R.C. Church. Then-governor Christine Todd Whitman, and former governors Brendan Byrne, Thomas Kean, and James Florio were in attendance. Cahill was interred at Calvary Cemetery in Cherry Hill Township, New Jersey. The William T. Cahill Center for Experiential Learning and Career Services at Ramapo College in Mahwah, New Jersey was dedicated in his honor on September 10, 1997.

See also

 List of governors of New Jersey

References

External links
 
 Biography of William T. Cahill (PDF), New Jersey State Library
 New Jersey Governor William T. Cahill, National Governors Association
 William Thomas Cahill  at The Political Graveyard
 

1912 births
1996 deaths
Camden Catholic High School alumni
Republican Party governors of New Jersey
Republican Party members of the New Jersey General Assembly
Politicians from Camden, New Jersey
People from Collingswood, New Jersey
Politicians from Philadelphia
Princeton University faculty
Rutgers School of Law–Camden alumni
Saint Joseph's University alumni
American people of Irish descent
Republican Party members of the United States House of Representatives from New Jersey
Princeton School of Public and International Affairs alumni
20th-century American politicians
Catholics from Pennsylvania
Catholics from New Jersey
Burials in New Jersey